Brinton Carl "Brit" Piez (August 9, 1923 – November 24, 1995) was an American football, basketball, baseball, lacrosse, and golf coach.  He was the 28th head football coach at Dickinson College in Carlisle, Pennsylvania, serving for two seasons, from 1955 to 1956, and compiling a record of 4–13.

References

External links
 

1923 births
1995 deaths
Dickinson Red Devils football coaches
Rhode Island Rams baseball coaches
Temple Owls football players
Upper Iowa Peacocks football coaches
Upper Iowa Peacocks men's basketball coaches
College golf coaches in the United States
College men's lacrosse coaches in the United States